"Without You" is a song written and recorded by David Bowie in 1983 for his fifteenth studio album Let's Dance. It was released as a single by EMI America in the Netherlands, the US, Japan and Spain in November 1983.

The front cover features artwork by the pre-eminent artist Keith Haring, back cover photograph is by longtime Bowie collaborator Denis O'Regan.

Track listing

7": EMI America / B 8190 (US)
"Without You"   – 3:08
"Criminal World"  – 4:25

Personnel
David Bowie – vocals
Stevie Ray Vaughan – guitar
Nile Rodgers – guitar
Bernard Edwards – bass guitar
Tony Thompson – drums
Stan Harrison – saxophone
Steve Elson – saxophone
Frank Simms – backing vocals
George Simms – backing vocals

Production
David Bowie – producer
Nile Rodgers – producer

Chart performance

See also
List of post-disco artists and songs

References

1983 singles
1983 songs
David Bowie songs
Post-disco songs
Songs written by David Bowie
Song recordings produced by Nile Rodgers
EMI America Records singles
Singles with cover art by Keith Haring